The L-sit is an acrobatic body position in which all body weight rests on the hands, with the torso held in a slightly forward-leaning orientation, with legs held horizontally so that each leg forms a nominal right-angle with the torso. The right-angle causes the body to have a notable "L" shape, hence the name "L-sit". It requires significant abdominal strength.

When executing an L-sit, a variety of supports may be used by the performer, including gymnastics apparatus such as the floor, rings, parallel bars or parallettes, or the hands of an adagio partner.

The performer's legs may be held together in front of the body or, in a variant called the straddled L-sit, the legs may be separated so that they straddle the arms.

Similar positions
The V-sit is similar to the L-sit except that the legs are raised further, so that the feet are held above the hips. In the even more difficult manna, the legs continue to rotate up and back until the torso is raised and the hips are held above the shoulders.

Human positions
Static elements (gymnastics)